The Virginia High School League (VHSL) is the principal sanctioning organization for interscholastic athletic competition among public high schools in the Commonwealth of Virginia. The VHSL first sponsored debate and also continues to sponsor state championships in several academic activities.

Private and religious schools and teams of homeschooled students belong to other sanctioning organizations, the largest of which is the Virginia Independent Schools Athletic Association.  Proposals in the Virginia General Assembly to mandate that the VHSL allow homeschooled students to compete for the public high school they would otherwise attend have failed to pass.

History 
The VHSL was established in 1913 by members of both the Jefferson Literary and Debating Society and the Washington Literary Society and Debating Union at the University of Virginia to serve as a debating league for the state's high schools.  During the 1910s, it expanded to over 250 schools and added championships in oral reading, baseball, basketball, and track and renamed itself the Virginia High School Literary and Athletic League.

After World War II, it adopted other sports and began standardizing officiating practices for high school sports. In 1969, it merged with the Virginia Interscholastic Association, which was a similar organization that had served African American schools around the Commonwealth during segregation. Girls' sports were added around this time.  Statewide football playoffs also began in 1970.

Organization 
The VHSL is headquartered in Pantops Charlottesville and has 308 member schools and conducts championships in 27 different sports.  Nearly 200,000 students participate in its activities annually.  The VHSL is overseen by an Executive Committee elected from the principals and superintendents of the various Virginia school districts. Day-to-day affairs are handled by the Executive Director and Assistant Directors.

Former classification, basis for regular season competition
From 1970, the VHSL's member schools were organized into three group classifications based on enrollment: A, AA, and AAA. Each of the three groups were split into four geographic regions, which usually contained three or four districts. District sizes vary and consist of four to eleven teams. The group of schools with the largest enrollments were in Group AAA, the group with the next largest enrollments were in Group AA, and the schools with the smallest enrollments were in Group A. Regional boundaries were different for all three groups as average school sizes vary substantially in different parts of Virginia.

Nearly all Group AAA schools were located in Northern Virginia, Hampton Roads, and Greater Richmond, with a few outliers in the Roanoke, Lynchburg, and Danville areas.  Group A schools were typically found in rural areas, with the largest concentration in Southwest Virginia.  Group AA schools were somewhat more widely distributed than the other two and found in rapidly growing areas like Loudoun County, in and around cities such as Roanoke, Lynchburg, Harrisonburg, and Charlottesville, and in some cities and counties which have a single high school.  Unlike many state associations, districts and regions were the same for every sport with few exceptions.

Redistricting and regrouping occurred every two years.  Group AAA schools typically had enrollments above 1,500 students, Group AA schools typically had from 700 to about 1,500 students, and Group A schools had fewer than 700 students.  Schools could request to play up a group.  Several schools in the Richmond and Hampton Roads areas competed in the Central and Eastern Regions of Group AAA instead of Group AA due to a reluctance to travel long distances in the post-season. In Southwest Virginia, some schools with Group A enrollment levels competed in Group AA due to traditionally being part of that group. Lee High School in Jonesville received a special dispensation from the VHSL to play in Group A despite having Group AA enrollment numbers due to being far away from the nearest schools in Group AA and not having substantially more students than large Group A schools.

In football, each region was further split into two divisions based on school enrollment, so statewide champions were determined in Divisions 1 through 6.  Divisions 1 and 2 were for Group A with Division 2 being the one for schools with larger enrollments; 3 and 4, the Group AA schools; and 5 and 6, the Group AAA schools.  The division format was first adopted in 1986 for football and was expanded in the late 2000s and early 2010s to some other sports in Groups A and AA.

Since the average enrollments of schools varied by region in each group, some schools in one region had enrollments which would have placed them in the different division of another region.  Most districts contained members in both divisions of its group, and a single district had two state championship teams on a few occasions.  Because of the number of schools choosing to play up, in some years a state championship team from a lower division had a greater enrollment than a state championship team in a higher division.

2013 reclassification, basis for post-season competition
In the 2013-2014 school year, the former three group classification system was replaced by a six group classification system with Group 1A schools having the smallest enrollments and Group 6A schools having the largest enrollments. Generally, schools which had competed in Group A have been assigned to the new Groups 1A and 2A; in Group AA, the new Groups 3A and 4A; and in Group AAA, the new Groups 5A and 6A. Unlike the former system, the VHSL intends that the group classifications will remain approximately the same size, and schools will not be allowed to compete for a state championship in a group classification above or below the one determined by their enrollment.  Regrouping will occur every two years.

Many schools which had competed at the former Group AAA level, particularly in the Central and Eastern Regions, have been assigned to Groups 4A or 3A.  To a lesser extent, some smaller schools from the former Group AA have been assigned to Group 2A, a few larger school from the former Group A to Group 3A, and some larger schools from the former Group AA, particularly in Loudoun County, to Group 5A.

The district system largely based on the prior group classifications has been retained for regular season competition and districts may now include schools from different group classifications to maintain local rivalries and minimize travel during the regular season.  Some Group AAA and AA districts with few schools and which were geographically isolated from other districts in the same group were dissolved and their member schools assigned to districts of nearby schools with smaller enrollments.

Schools are not required to play a district rival which is at least three group classifications higher.  For example, a school in Group 3A is not required to play against a school in Group 6A but is required to play against schools in Groups 5A and 4A.  In some cases, no district championship is awarded when there is not a full round robin schedule of all district teams.

Schools have also been assigned to a conference of schools from the same group classification for the first round of post-season competition.  There are a total of 48 conferences, designated by numbers in reverse order of the group classification numbers.  (i.e. Conference 1 is in Group 6A while Conference 48 is in Group 1A.)  Conferences are not uniform in the number of the member schools and almost always include schools in other districts.  Only two conferences are composed solely of the members of one district.  There are no uniform rules for the seeding of schools in conference competition based on regular season results.

The six groups are not divided into four regions as before.  Instead, each group classification is divided into two regions of four conferences each.  The two regions are designated North/South in Groups 6A, 5A, and 4A and East/West in Groups 3A, 2A, and 1A.  In most team sports, the top two teams from conference playoffs advance to compete in regional playoffs.  The top two teams from regional playoffs advance to a final four state playoff competition to determine the state champion.

The conferences are not used for football playoffs in ten of the twelve regions.  Instead, the sixteen schools with the most VHSL points from each region compete in the regional playoffs.  The exception is that the first three rounds of the playoffs in the South regions in Groups 6A and 5A are split into two sections of two conferences each with eight schools qualifying for the playoffs in each section.  The two sectional champions meet for the regional championship in the fourth round.

In Groups 6A, 5A, and 4A, the two regional champions play for the state championship. (i.e. The regional championship game is also the state semi-final.)  In Groups 3A, 2A, and 1A, the final four teams are cross-bracketed in the state semi-finals with the higher remaining seed in one region hosting the lower remaining seed in the other region. (i.e. No regional championship is awarded.)  This format could allow two teams from the same region to play for the state championship.

 Class 1A - 475 or less
 Class 2A - 476-735
 Class 3A - 736-1,060
 Class 4A - 1,133-1,540
 Class 5A - 1,541-1,950
 Class 6A - 1,951-3,777

Athletic activities
Athletic activities include the following:

For boys and girls: Basketball, Cross Country, Golf, Lacrosse, Gymnastics, Indoor track, Outdoor track, Soccer, Swimming/diving, Tennis, Volleyball

For boys: Baseball, Football, Wrestling

For girls: Cheerleading, Field hockey, Softball

Boys' and girls' sports will allow members of the opposite sex to participate in some circumstances.

Academic activities 
Academic activities include the following:

Creative Writing, Debate, Drama (one-act plays), Forensics (a variety of individual events), Magazines, Newspapers, Scholastic Bowl, and Yearbooks

Academic activities are coed and not considered varsity athletics by most schools. Academic activities are usually awarded different letters and honors from athletics.

The VHSL academic activities season begins in September with a series of journalism education workshops in four cities across the state that is sponsored by Jostens.  The VHSL/Jostens Regional Workshops began in 2005 and target both students and advisers of newspaper, magazine, and yearbook publications.  The 2007 series included stops in Virginia Beach, Richmond, Roanoke, and Dulles.

This event is followed up by what is referred to as the state journalism workshop, or the Championship Journalism Workshop in October, which is both an educational and recognition event.  Held at Virginia Commonwealth University since 1989, the CJW celebrates the results of the newspaper, magazine, and yearbook evaluations that schools submit each June to the VHSL.  The two-day workshop offers about 100 classes that are taught mostly by the state's top advisers, but also by college professors, industry professionals, and recognized out-of-state advisers.  Since 2005, the awards portion of this event has been held in the nearby historic Jefferson Hotel's ballroom.  State champions in newspaper, magazine, and yearbook publications are given an evaluation on their publication known as Trophy Class.  Publications that receive five Trophy Class ratings in seven or fewer years are also awarded the Savedge Award for Sustained Excellence, named after renowned yearbook adviser Colonel Charles Savedge.  The VHSL also annually awards the Student Journalist of the Year to a deserving senior, which comes with the Savedge scholarship.

The VHSL academic season continues with the Group A and AA One Act Theatre Festivals, traditionally held the first week of December in Charlottesville.  Eight schools representing the top two in both district and regional competition present plays that are 35 or fewer minutes in length.  Preferably four, but no fewer than three, judges usually consisting of both high school directors and professionals evaluate the performances and recognize both the champion and runner-up school.  Also recognized are eight outstanding actors.

In February, the top eight schools that have advanced from regional competition in Groups A, AA, and AAA go to the College of William and Mary for Scholastic Bowl competition.  Two four-person teams meet head-to-head in this double-elimination tournament, answering questions in mathematics, science/health, social studies, English, and miscellany (including current events, fine arts, music, entertainment and sports).  There are three rounds, including two toss-up rounds where either team may answer and one round of directed questioning toward individual schools.  Toss-up rounds consist of 15 questions and directed rounds include 10 questions per team.  The champion and runner-up are recognized in each grouping.

The state forensics tournament occurs on a single day in late March/early April and consists of ten individual events:  duo interpretation, serious dramatic interpretation, humorous dramatic interpretation, storytelling, poetry interpretation, prose interpretation, foreign extemporaneous speaking, domestic extemporaneous speaking, impromptu speaking, and original oratory.  At this tournament, Group A, AA, and AAA competition occur separately, but simultaneously.  The top six students in each category and in each group are recognized with the top four earning points toward a team sweepstakes.  The team champion and runner-up are also recognized.

Debate is a two-day tournament in April that features four events:  Student Congress, Lincoln-Douglas, Public Forum, and Policy.  This competition has taken place at Liberty University since 1999.  Public Forum, added in 2011, is the newest VHSL debate event. The top four individuals (or two-person policy and public forum teams) earn points toward a team sweepstakes.  The team champion and runner-up are also recognized.

The VHSL academic activities season culminates with the judging of creative writing entries announced in mid-late May.  In March, schools submit a folder containing six works (2 poems, 2 short stories, and 2 essays) written by six different students.  These school folders have traditionally been evaluated by judges at the University of Virginia's creative writing department. Judges award individual awards for the three categories in each group (A, AA, and AAA) as well as an overall school folder winner in each group.

The VHSL also awards the Wachovia Cup for each group to the schools which accumulate the most points across all competitions much like the NACDA Director's Cup for college athletics.  There are separate cups for athletic and academic activities.

Districts
Districts are geographically-organized groups and may contain schools in varying classifications.

Capital District
Central District
Colonial District
Dominion District
Beach District
Eastern District
Peninsula District
Southeastern District
Concorde District
Gunston District
Liberty District
National District
Patriot District
Cardinal District
Cedar Run District
Commonwealth District

Battlefield District
Bay Rivers District
Southside District
Dulles District
Potomac District
Jefferson District
Northwestern District
Blue Ridge District
Seminole District
Valley District
Piedmont District
River Ridge District

Eastern Shore District
Northern Neck District
Tidewater District
Tri-Rivers District
Bull Run District
Dogwood District
James River District
Shenandoah District
Hogoheegee District
Mountain Empire District
Pioneer District
Three Rivers District
Black Diamond District
Cumberland District
Mountain District
Southwest District

Regions

Class 6 
Region A
Region B
Region C
Region D

Class 5 
Region A
Region B
Region C
Region D

Class 4 
Region A
Region B
Region C
Region D

Class 3 
Region A
Region B
Region C
Region D

Class 2 
Region A
Region B
Region C
Region D

Class 1 
Region A
Region B
Region C
Region D

References

External links 
 VHSL-Reference 
 Virginia High School League
 Members of VHSL Group A
 Members of VHSL Group AA
 Members of VHSL Group AAA

 
Education in Virginia
High school sports associations in the United States
Organizations based in Charlottesville, Virginia
Sports organizations established in 1913
High school sports in Virginia
1913 establishments in Virginia